The River Waldron is a small river in Staffordshire and Cheshire in north west England. It drains water from the area between Audley and Crewe, and joins the River Weaver to the west of Crewe. It is known by several different names among its length, including Alsager Brook and Valley Brook. Its principal tributaries are Wistaston Brook and Barthomley Brook.

It rises in Parrot's Drumble on the outskirts of Talke, and flows roughly westwards through Alsager and Crewe.

Notes and references

Notes

Bibliography

Rivers of Cheshire
Rivers of Staffordshire
1Waldron